Stacy Edwards (born March 4, 1965) is an American actress. She appeared in a number of B movies before her breakthrough role in the 1997 black comedy film In the Company of Men, for which she received Independent Spirit Award for Best Female Lead nomination. Edwards later had roles in films such as Primary Colors (1998), Black and White (1999) and Driven (2001), and was a regular cast member in the drama series Chicago Hope (1997–1999).

Career
Edwards began her career on daytime television. She portrayed Hayley Benson on the daytime soap opera Santa Barbara from 1986 to 1988. (Julia Roberts had unsuccessfully auditioned for the role.) Edwards spent the following decade appearing in an episodes of television shows such as 21 Jump Street, Quantum Leap, L.A. Law,  and Murder, She Wrote, and B movies include Relentless 3 and Skeeter. She also was regular cast member in the comedy-drama series Sons and Daughters in 1991.

In 1997, Edwards starred alongside Aaron Eckhart in the black comedy film In the Company of Men, for which she received Independent Spirit Award for Best Female Lead nomination. She also starred in the drama series Chicago Hope as Dr. Lisa Catera for two seasons from 1997 to 1999. In 1998, Edwards appeared as Jennifer Rogers in Mike Nichols' comedy-drama film Primary Colors, playing the lesbian lover of Kathy Bates' character. She later co-starred in films Black and White (1999), The Bachelor  (1999), The Next Best Thing (2000), and Driven (2001). She also starred opposite Johnathon Schaech in the 1998 television movie Houdini. As lead actress, she starred in Four Dogs Playing Poker and Mexico City in 2000.

During the 2000s and 2010s, Edwards had many guest-starring roles in various television shows, including CSI: Crime Scene Investigation, Law & Order: Special Victims Unit, NCIS, House, Veronica Mars, Criminal Minds, Private Practice, The Mentalist, Hawaii Five-0, Castle, Grey's Anatomy, How to Get Away with Murder, and Shameless. She also had a recurring role in the series The Lying Game from 2011 to 2012.

Filmography

Film

Television

Awards and nominations

References

External links

 
 

1965 births
American film actresses
American soap opera actresses
American television actresses
Living people
Actresses from Montana
20th-century American actresses
21st-century American actresses
People from Glasgow, Montana